John Batchelor (born 1970) was a key member and 2nd row in the 1997–98 Exeter Rugby-Football Union squad who gained promotion to the top tier of English rugby for the first time in the squad's history. He was often described as one of the larger characters in the dressing room, and someone who was always up for a laugh and a friendly smidgen of banter.

Early life
John Batchelor was born in Malabo, Equatorial Guinea. His family moved to Kingston upon Hull in England soon after his birth.

Rugby career
Batchelor worked his way up from being captain of his school team in Hull and then an important player in the Hull Ionians youth team. Batchelor then moved to the Exeter Chiefs Rugby Club. It was here that his career was made, becoming an indispensable member of the squad. Batchelor's great physical strength gave him an advantage over smaller players in the lower leagues of rugby. Batchelor used this great strength to carry his team up to the heights, never scaled by Exeter Rugby before, of the Aviva Premiership.

References

Living people
Exeter Chiefs players
1970 births